The Ganga, or Ganges, formerly also spelled Gunga, is one of the largest rivers in India.

Ganga may also refer to:

Film
 Ganga (1960 film), a Bengali film directed by Rajen Tarafdar
 Ganga (1965 film), a Bhojpuri film directed by Kundan Kuma
 Ganga (1972 film), a Tamil film directed by M. Karnan
 Ganga (2006 film), a  Bhojpuri film directed by Abhishek Chhadha
 Bodyguard (2012 film) (formerly Ganga), a 2012 Telugu film directed by Gopichand Malineni
 Ganga (2015 film), a Kannada film directed by Sai Prakash

Other uses
 Ganga (TV series), a 2017 Indian Tamil-language supernatural soap opera
 Daren Ganga (born 1979), a West Indies cricketer
 Ganga (music), a type of rural folk singing from Croatia, Bosnia and Herzegovina, and Montenegro
 Ganga in Hinduism, the Hindu goddess that personifies the Ganges River
 Eastern Ganga dynasty, a medieval Indian dynasty
 Western Ganga dynasty (Gangas), an ancient southern Indian dynasty
 Ganga, a stage name for Danish electronic musician Christian Rønn

See also
 Ganga in Hinduism
 Ganges (disambiguation)
 Ganja (disambiguation)